Pancalia nodosella is a moth in the family Cosmopterigidae. It is found in Portugal, Spain, France, the Netherlands, Germany, Austria, Italy, Slovenia, Slovakia, most of the Balkan Peninsula, Ukraine, Latvia and Russia. In the east, the range extends through the Caucasus and Central Asia to Kyrgyzstan.

The wingspan is 12–16 mm. Adults are on wing in May.

The larvae feed on Viola curtisii. They initially mine the leaf stem of their host plant, but also make irregular blotch mines in the leaves. Older larvae may resort to window feeding on the outside of the leaves, but eventually bore the subterranean part of the stem. Larvae can be found from June to July.

References

External links
lepiforum.de

Moths described in 1851
Antequerinae
Moths of Europe
Moths of Asia